Honey Creek is a stream in Johnson and Lafayette counties in the U.S. state of Missouri. It is a tributary of the Blackwater River.

Honey Creek was named for the honeybees near its course.

See also
List of rivers of Missouri

References

Rivers of Johnson County, Missouri
Rivers of Lafayette County, Missouri
Rivers of Missouri